One Man Army is the second album by Scottish alternative folk rock band Kassidy. The album was released on 27 September 2012 through Mercury Records.

Production
The album was recorded at Rockfield Studios in a week.

Critical reception
The Guardian wrote that the band "certainly fall back on derivative harmonic techniques – any resemblance to Crosby, Stills & Nash is, presumably, intentional – and aim for a sweetly emollient guitar sound rather than originality." The Skinny wrote that "Kassidy seem to have taken every single step to be as inoffensive as possible."

Track listing

Personnel 
Kassidy
 Lewis Andrew - composer, primary artist
 Hamish Fingland - composer, primary artist
 Barrie-James O'Neill - composer, primary artist
 Chris Potter - composer, primary artist

Additional personnel
 Jim Abbiss - producer
 Barny - mixing
 Mike Crossey - mixing
 Steve Davis - engineer
 Russell Fawcus - engineer
 Kieran Logan - drums
 Thomas McNeice - engineer, mixing, producer
 Christian Wright - mastering

References 

2012 albums
Kassidy albums
Mercury Records albums
Albums produced by Jim Abbiss